Yandruwandha may be,

Yandruwandha people
Yandruwandha language

Language and nationality disambiguation pages